Gloria Hatrick McLean (March 10, 1918 – February 16, 1994) was an American actress and model.

Early life
Gloria was born on March 10, 1918, to Edgar B. Hatrick of Larchmont, New York. Her family spent the summers at The Broadmoor hotel and resort. She attended the Finch School in New York and spent two years studying drama at a dramatic school.

Personal life

First marriage
In 1943, she married Edward Beale McLean Jr., a son of heiress Evalyn Walsh McLean and Edward Beale McLean, heir to The Washington Post. McLean had previously been married to Ann Carroll Meem, of Washington, D.C., from May 1938 to July 1943. Together Edward and Gloria had two sons: Michael and Ronald McLean. Ronald died on June 8, 1969, aged 24, in Vietnam as a commissioned Marine officer.

In January 1948, Gloria and Edward divorced and in October of that year, he married Manuela "Mollie" Hudson, the former wife of Alfred Gwynne Vanderbilt Jr.

Second marriage

On August 9, 1949, she married James Stewart, who adopted both children from her first marriage, Ronald, then age five, and Michael, age three. Together, she and Stewart had twin daughters born on May 7, 1951: Judy and Kelly. Kelly Stewart became an anthropologist.

According to her obituary in the Los Angeles Times, "Mrs. Stewart was active on the boards of the Greater Los Angeles Zoo Association, Natural History Museum, African Wildlife Foundation and St. John's Medical Center, and was a regular at charity dinners, dances and other events supporting those groups. ... She shared her husband's interests in skeet shooting, fishing, animals and travel. A fan magazine in 1985 called their partnership 'Dream Factory's Outstanding Marriage'". From the 1950s onward, Mrs. Stewart was a supporter of conserving big-game animals, rather than hunting them, and in time brought her husband around to the same viewpoint.

The couple remained married until her death from lung cancer on February 16, 1994, at the age of 75. In February 1997, Jimmy Stewart was hospitalized for an irregular heartbeat and on June 25, a thrombosis formed in his right leg, leading to a pulmonary embolism one week later.

Surrounded by his children on July 2, 1997, Stewart died at the age of 89 at his home in Beverly Hills, California, with his final words to his family being, "I'm going to be with Gloria now."

References

External links

 
1918 births
1994 deaths
Female models from New York (state)
Actresses from New York City
Burials at Forest Lawn Memorial Park (Glendale)
20th-century American actresses
Deaths from lung cancer in New York (state)